Moreomabele is a village in Central District of Botswana. It is located 75 km north of Palapye, along the road from Palapye to Francistown, and it has a primary school. The population was 478 in 2001 census.

References

Populated places in Central District (Botswana)
Villages in Botswana